NCAA Division I women's ice hockey All-Tournament team is an honor bestowed at the conclusion of the NCAA women's ice hockey tournament to the players judged to have performed the best during the championship. The team is currently composed of three forwards, two defensemen and one goaltender with additional players named in the event of a tie. Voting for the honor was conducted by the head coaches of each member team once the tournament has completed and any player regardless of their team's finish is eligible. The All-Tournament Team began being awarded after the first championship in 2001.

All-Tournament teams

2000s

2010s

2020s

All-Tournament team players by school

Multiple appearances

References 

+
All-Tournament Teams